Karel Traxler (1866 in Vlachovo Březí – 1936 in Volyně) was a Czech chess master and composer of chess problems.

He is best known for the hyper-aggressive variation named after him, the Traxler Variation in the Two Knights Defense, which was first shown in the following game against Reinisch, played in Hostouň in 1890:

1.e4 e5 2.Nf3 Nc6 3.Bc4 Nf6 4.Ng5 Bc5!? 5.Nxf7?! (modern theory suggests that 5.Bxf7+! is better) Bxf2+! 6.Ke2 (Traxler recommends 6.Kf1! Qe7 7.Nxh8 d5 8.exd5 Nd4, where Black has a strong attack but White may nonetheless hold) 6...Nd4+ 7.Kd3? b5! 8.Bb3 Nxe4!! 9.Nxd8 Nc5+ 10.Kc3 Ne2+! 11.Qxe2 Bd4+ 12.Kb4 a5+ 13.Kxb5 Ba6+ 14.Kxa5 Bd3+ 15.Kb4 Na6+ 16.Ka4 Nb4+ 17.Kxb4 c5#

Here is his victory over Oldřich Duras in Veselí nad Lužnicí in 1902:

1.e4 e5 2.Nf3 Nc6 3.Bc4 Bc5 4.c3 Nf6 5.d4 exd4 6.cxd4 Bb4+ 7.Bd2 Bxd2+ 8.Nbxd2 Nxe4 9.d5 Nxd2 10.Qxd2 Nb8 11.d6 O-O 12.Rc1 Nc6 13.dxc7 Qxc7 14.O-O Qa5 15.Qd6 Qb4 16.Bxf7 Rxf7 17.Rxc6 Qxb2 18.Re1 Qf6 19.Qd5 1-0

Because Traxler was a Roman-Catholic priest, he rarely played chess in serious competitions. As a composer of chess problems he pursued the style of Bohemian school.  He wrote under a number of pseudonyms:  Anonymus z Tábora, Karel Kaplan, Vis Maior und Karel Zboněk.  From 1896 to 1899, he edited, in part, the journal České listy šachové (Czech chess letters).  He composed over 900 chess problems, mainly 2-, 3- and 4-move problems, but also multiple move ones, and more rarely, selfmates.  With his brother-in-law, Jan Kotrč, he published a selection of 247 problems that he'd composed by 1910.

Solution:

1. Qf8! Kxe4
2. Kf6 Kxf4
3. Qb4# Ideal mate

2. ... Kd4
3. Qb4# Model mate

1. ... Kd4
2. Qe8 Kc4
3. Qa4# Model mate

References

External links 
 

1866 births
1936 deaths
19th-century Czech Roman Catholic priests
20th-century Czech Roman Catholic priests
Czech chess players
Chess writers
Chess composers
People from Prachatice District